John Fox   was  an English priest in the 16th century.

Fox was educated at Corpus Christi College, Oxford. He held the living at Wroughton, Wiltshire. Fox was appointed an archdeacon of Winchester in 1519 and canon of Lincoln Cathedral in 1526. He died in 1530

Notes

1530 deaths
Lincoln Cathedral
Archdeacons of Winchester (ancient)
Alumni of Corpus Christi College, Oxford